News18 Bihar-Jharkhand is an Indian regional television channel aimed at the states of Bihar and Jharkhand. It was launched as part of 5 Hindi-language TV channels for different states of India. It mainly includes indepth news from across the districts of Bihar and Jharkhand and also mainly shows programs related to local cultures and customs. It is the third most watched channel in the Bhojpuri market. Launched as ETV Bihar-Jharkhand, it adopted its current name on 16 March 2018.

See also
 Network 18
 CNN-News18

References

External links
 News18 India's Official website

Television channels and stations established in 2001
Mass media in Bihar
Television stations in Patna
Organisations based in Patna
2002 establishments in Bihar
24-hour television news channels in India